Tezampanel (INN, USAN) (code names LY-293,558, NGX-424) is a drug originally developed by Eli Lilly which acts as a competitive antagonist of the AMPA and kainate subtypes of the ionotropic glutamate receptor family, with selectivity for the GluR5 subtype of the kainate receptor.  It has neuroprotective and anticonvulsant properties, the former of which may, at least in part, occur via blockade of calcium uptake into neurons.

Tezampanel has a range of effects which may be useful for medicinal purposes, as well as its applications in scientific research. It suppresses both the withdrawal symptoms from morphine and other opioids, and the development of tolerance, as well as having antihyperalgesic and analgesic effects in its own right. It also has anxiolytic effects in animal studies and has been suggested as a candidate for the treatment of anxiety in humans.

References 

AMPA receptor antagonists
Analgesics
Anticonvulsants
Antimigraine drugs
Carboxylic acids
Decahydroisoquinolines
Eli Lilly and Company brands
Kainate receptor antagonists
Neuroprotective agents
Tetrazoles